Crespiatica is a comune (municipality) in the Province of Lodi in the Italian region Lombardy, located about  southeast of Milan and about  southeast of Lodi.

Crespiatica borders the following municipalities: Dovera, Bagnolo Cremasco, Vaiano Cremasco, Monte Cremasco, Chieve, Corte Palasio, Abbadia Cerreto.

References

Cities and towns in Lombardy